Broom is a full-length album from American indie pop/rock band Someone Still Loves You Boris Yeltsin. It was released in the United States in 2005.

Track listing

 "Pangea" – 2:48
 "I Am Warm & Powerful" – 2:39
 "What'll We Do" – 2:16
 "Travel Song" – 3:21
 "Oregon Girl" – 2:26
 "House Fire" – 3:19
 "Yr Broom" – 1:37
 "Anna Lee" – 3:16
 "Anne Elephant" – 4:49
 "Gwyneth" – 2:33

The Polyvinyl LP-reissue includes three bonus songs: "Let's Get Tired", "Warm & Powerful" (acoustic), and "Song W".

Personnel 
 John Robert Cardwell – vocals, guitars
 Will Knauer – guitars
 Tom Hembree – bass
 Philip Dickey – drums, vocals, guitars, piano
 Mark Bilyeu – mastering
 Jonathan James – mixing
 Aaron Scott – photography, layout design

Additional personnel 
 Lauren Slater – Rhodes on "Pangea", "I Am Warm and Powerful", "Anne Elephant"
 Gwyn Knauer and Beth Cain – additional vocals on "What'll We Do"

References 

Someone Still Loves You Boris Yeltsin albums
2005 albums